John Thompson BD (d. 23 April 1571) was a Canon of Windsor from 1563 to 1574

Career

He was appointed:
Canon of Gloucester 1552 - 1559
Prebendary of Minor Pars Altaris in Salisbury 1556
Prebendary of Durnford in Salisbury 1565 - 1571
Chaplain to Queen Elizabeth I

He was appointed to the third stall in St George's Chapel, Windsor Castle in 1563 and held the canonry until 1571.

Notes 

1571 deaths
Canons of Windsor
Year of birth unknown